Yordanka Ivanova (née Filipova, ; born 25 February 1950) is a Bulgarian sprinter. She competed in the women's 4 × 400 metres relay at the 1976 Summer Olympics.

References

1950 births
Living people
Athletes (track and field) at the 1976 Summer Olympics
Bulgarian female sprinters
Olympic athletes of Bulgaria
Sportspeople from Pleven
Olympic female sprinters